Leptomyxa is a free-living genus of lobose naked multinucleate amoebae in the order Leptomyxida that inhabits freshwater, soil and mosses. It is very closely related to the genus Rhizamoeba, and some species have been moved between the two genera due to molecular data.

Description
Members of this genus have loboreticulopodia: wide and smooth cytoplasmic projections (like lobopodia) that can also connect to each other to form a net-like structure (like reticulopodia).
They differ from Rhizamoeba not only on a molecular level but also in their morphology: each Leptomyxa cell has usually up to hundreds of nuclei, while Rhizamoeba cells contain between one and up to dozens of nuclei, and the organization of the cell is plasmodial among Leptomyxa while monopodial among Rhizamoeba.

Classification
As of 2017, nine species belong to this genus.
 Leptomyxa ambigua 
 Leptomyxa arborea 
 Leptomyxa australiensis 
 Leptomyxa flabellata 
 Leptomyxa fragilis 
 Leptomyxa neglecta 
 Leptomyxa reticulata  (type species)
 Leptomyxa valladaresi 
 Leptomyxa variabilis

References

Amoebozoa genera
Tubulinea
Taxa described in 1915